Valnice Milhomens Coelho (born 16 July 1947) is a Brazilian pastor, apostle, author, and televangelist, founder and president of Ministério Palavra da Fé and the Igreja Nacional do Senhor Jesus Cristo (Insejec), currently based in Brasilia.

Biography 

Converted to Protestantism to 15 years old. She attended the Seminary of Christian Educators, in Recife, receiving a bachelor's degree in Social Work and Religious Education.

In January 1971, she was sent as the first missionary of the Brazilian Baptist Convention to Africa, from 13 years as a missionary in Mozambique and two years in South Africa, after returned to Brazil claiming to have a specific command of God in 1986: I have a ministry for you in Brazil. Train me an army! On 5 December 1987, was founded in Recife city, the Ministério Palavra da Fé (Ministry Word of Faith), an interdenominational organization chaired by her.

Valnice was the first woman evangelical leader to use television as an instrument of evangelization. In 1989, after a series of seminars held in São Paulo, a pastor and businessman made his proposal to put the filming of seminars on TV for three months. So went on television on 24 June 1989, with the program A Palavra da Fé.

She was ordained pastor on 30 April 1993, by a group of pastors. She traveled to Bogota, Colombia in 1999, there she met the Pastor César Castellanos and adopted the cellular model in the Government of 12. In June 1999 brought to Brazil the couple César and Claudia Castellanos, for convention Avivamento Celular – Desafios para o Século XXI where more than 3,500 pastors of various denominations and all parts of the country, heard and many have adopted the Mobile Vision. At the time, César pastor anointed Valnice as part of its international team of 12.

On 5 August 2001 was anointed "apostle" by Dr. Rony Chaves, apostle and prophet of Costa Rica, at a conference held in São Paulo, in the Comunhão Cristã – Igreja Apostólica.

The INSEJEC has work in Mozambique, Angola, Portugal, Switzerland, Spain, Germany, France, Middle East, and Japan.

On 6 November 2009 she received the title of Honorary Citizen of Brasilia, in a formal ceremony by the Legislative Chamber of the Federal District, held in the Temple Headquarters INSEJEC in Vicente Pires, Brasilia.

Valnice is the author of several books, as Personalidades Restauradas. It is single, as he opted to celibacy. She currently resides in Brasilia. She acted in Elections 2010 and 2014, supporting the presidential candidate Marina Silva.

In July 2013, Valnice, along with several pastors and evangelical leaders met with President Dilma Rousseff in Brasilia.

In May 2014, she participated in the caravan of Christian band Diante do Trono, that occurred in the city of Jerusalem, in Israel, where there was the recording of the seventeenth band album, entitled Tetelestai.

She is also known for her prophecies. In one of them she said Jesus would come back in 2007.

References

External links
Official website
Insejec website

1947 births
Living people
Brazilian evangelicals
Brazilian television evangelists
Converts to Protestantism
People from Maranhão
Brazilian Christian religious leaders
Baptist missionaries in Mozambique
Baptist missionaries in South Africa